Richard Mark Newby, Baron Newby  (born 14 February 1953) is a British politician who has been the Leader of the Liberal Democrats in the House of Lords since September 2016.  He served as the Deputy Government Chief Whip in the House of Lords, and the Captain of the Yeomen of the Guard between 2012 and 2015, and the Liberal Democrat Chief Whip in the House of Lords from 2012 to 2016.

Early life, education and career 
Newby was born in February 1953, the son of Frank and Kathleen Newby. He was educated at the Rothwell Grammar School in the village of Lofthouse in West Yorkshire, followed by St Catherine's College at the University of Oxford, where he received a Bachelor of Arts degree in philosophy, politics and economics in 1974 and was later awarded a Master of Arts degree.

On leaving university, Newby joined HM Customs and Excise where he became principal in charge of budget coordination in 1980. He was then director of corporate affairs at Rosehaugh plc, at one time a major property developer. He subsequently became a consultant on corporate social responsibility.

Newby worked extensively on programmes which used the power of sport to help motivate and educate children and young people. He was chair of sport at The Prince's Trust (1997–2012), chair of International Development Through Sport (a UK Sport charity) and chair of Sport for Life International, of which he remains patron.

Political career 

Newby was Secretary of the Social Democratic Party Parliamentary Committee in 1981, David Owen described him as 'an able young civil servant who resigned to come and work for us', and National Secretary of the SDP from 1983 to 1988. He had parliamentary ambitions seeking the candidacy for Twickenham, challenging Vince Cable, in 1997. From 1999 to 2006, Newby was Chief of Staff to Charles Kennedy. He was instrumental in the process of managing the succession of leadership from Kennedy to Menzies Campbell.

He was appointed an Officer of the Order of the British Empire (OBE) in the 1990 New Year Honours and was created a life peer with the title Baron Newby, of Rothwell in the County of West Yorkshire on 25 September 1997.

At the beginning of May 2012, Lord Newby was appointed the Liberal Democrat Chief Whip in the House of Lords, and at the same time was appointed the Deputy Government Chief Whip in the House of Lords and Captain of the Yeomen of the Guard.

In September 2012, he was appointed Treasury spokesman in the House of Lords.

In September 2016 he was elected Leader of the Liberal Democrats in the House of Lords replacing Lord Wallace of Tankerness.

Personal life 
Lord Newby has been married since 1978 to Ailsa Ballantyne (née Thomson), a priest and Canon Residentiary of Ripon Cathedral; they have two sons. According to the House of Lords register of members interests, he jointly owns, with his wife, two flats in Lambeth, London, which are rented out.

References

External links

Lord Newby profile at the site of Liberal Democrats
The They Work For You website 

}
|-

|-

|-

1953 births
20th-century English businesspeople
20th-century British civil servants
21st-century English politicians
Alumni of St Catherine's College, Oxford
Liberal Democrats (UK) life peers
Life peers created by Elizabeth II
Living people
Members of the Privy Council of the United Kingdom
Officers of the Order of the British Empire
People from Rothwell, West Yorkshire
Social Democratic Party (UK) politicians